The 1995 Walker Cup, the 35th Walker Cup Match, was a team golf match played on 9 and 10 September 1995, at Royal Porthcawl Golf Club in Porthcawl, Wales. The event was won by the Great Britain and Ireland team 14 to 10.

Format
The format for play on Saturday and Sunday was the same. There were four matches of foursomes in the morning and eight singles matches in the afternoon. In all, 24 matches were played.

Each of the 24 matches is worth one point in the larger team competition. If a match is all square after the 18th hole extra holes are not played. Rather, each side earns ½ a point toward their team total. The team that accumulates at least 12 ½ points wins the competition.  If the two teams are tied, the previous winner retains the trophy.

Teams
Ten players for the USA and Great Britain & Ireland participate in the event plus one non-playing captain for each team.

Great Britain & Ireland
 & 
Captain:  Clive Brown
 Jody Fanagan
 Mark Foster
 Stephen Gallacher
 Pádraig Harrington
 Barclay Howard
 David Howell
 Lee S. James
 Graham Rankin
 Gordon Sherry
 Gary Wolstenholme

United States

Captain: Downing Gray
Notah Begay III
Alan Bratton
Jerry Courville Jr.
Kris Cox
John Harris
Tim Jackson
Trip Kuehne
Buddy Marucci
Chris Riley
Tiger Woods

Saturday's matches

Morning foursomes

Afternoon singles

Sunday's matches

Morning foursomes

Afternoon singles

References

 http://www.irishgolfdesk.com/walker-cup-1995/ Irish Golf Desk - Walker Cup 1995

Walker Cup
Golf tournaments in Wales
Walker Cup
Walker Cup
Walker Cup